Eremocharis is a genus of flowering plants belonging to the family Apiaceae.

Its native range is Peru to Northern Chile.

Species:

Eremocharis confinis 
Eremocharis ferreyrae 
Eremocharis fruticosa 
Eremocharis hutchisonii 
Eremocharis integrifolia 
Eremocharis longiramea 
Eremocharis piscoensis 
Eremocharis tripartita 
Eremocharis triradiata

References

Azorelloideae
Apiaceae genera